Shorzha may refer to:

 Shorzha, Armenia, is a village in the Gegharkunik Province of Armenia.
 Shorja, is a marketplace in Baghdad, Iraq.
 Nerkin Shorzha, is a small hamlet in the Gegharkunik Province of Armenia.
 Verin Shorzha, is a small hamlet in the Gegharkunik Province of Armenia.